John Wilson Shaffer (July 5, 1827 – October 31, 1870) was an American politician and businessman who served as the 7th Governor of Utah Territory.

Biography
Born in Lewisburg, Pennsylvania, Shaffer was active in Republican politics in Illinois. In 1849, Shaffer settled in Freeport, Illinois and was involved in the mercantile business. Then, in 1856, he was elected sheriff of Stephenson County, Illinois. He was elected clerk and recorder for the Illinois Circuit Court for Stephenson County. Shaffer served in the 15th Illinois Volunteer Infantry Regiment during the American Civil War and later served as quartermaster; being brevetted brigadier general when the war ended. He was appointed governor of the territory of Utah by President Ulysses S. Grant. He was known for his strict opposition of any hint of rebellion against the federal government, which led to concerns with the Mormon population. He died suddenly during his first year as governor.

Notes

Further reading

External links
 

1827 births
1870 deaths
People from Lewisburg, Pennsylvania
People from Freeport, Illinois
Businesspeople from Illinois
People of Illinois in the American Civil War
Illinois Republicans
Illinois sheriffs
Governors of Utah Territory
Utah Republicans
19th-century American politicians
Union Army colonels
19th-century American businesspeople
Military personnel from Pennsylvania